The Diamond is a baseball stadium located in Richmond, Virginia, USA, on Arthur Ashe Boulevard. It is the home of Richmond Flying Squirrels of the Eastern League and the Virginia Commonwealth University baseball team. From 1985 to 2008, it was the home of the Richmond Braves, the Triple-A minor league baseball affiliate of the Atlanta Braves. The Diamond seats 12,134 people for baseball; however, for Flying Squirrels games, advertising banners cover up the top rows of the upper deck, reducing seating capacity to 9,560.

History
The Diamond replaced the demolished Parker Field, which had been built in 1934, as part of the fair grounds. Parker Field had been converted for baseball in 1954, replacing Mooers Field. Parker Field housed the Braves from 1966 to 1984.

In 2003, part of The Diamond's roof was destroyed by Hurricane Isabel, and in 2004 a piece of a concrete beam the size of a football fell on the stands below, though no fans were injured.

The Richmond Braves relocated to Gwinnett County, Georgia, after the 2008 season. One factor in the franchise's decision to relocate was reportedly a failure to reach an agreement on building a new ballpark in Richmond. There was plan by a development group called the Richmond Baseball Initiative to build a new stadium in Shockoe Bottom near Main Street Station. But in August 2009 the company that submitted this ballpark plan withdrew it. Under the plan, the Richmond Braves would have moved to the new stadium while the Diamond would become the sole home to Virginia Commonwealth University athletics. VCU Baseball previously shared the facility with the Braves for home games.

The new team announced on October 2, 2009 that they were going to spend $1.5 million on renovations to the ballpark and the RMA gave an additional $75,000 for upgrades. On October 28, 2009, the Richmond Flying Squirrels started renovations on the Diamond. They tore out aluminum benches and started to replace them with 3,200 dark green seats with cup holders. There are now 6,200 seats in the lower level.  A new larger sized store was built for the Squirrels. Extensive gutting and remodeling of the offices and new indoor batting cages are parts of the renovation plan as well.  For 2011, the scoreboard was enhanced and two new party decks were built in the upper level.

Ownership of The Diamond was transferred from the Richmond Metropolitan Authority to the city of Richmond in 2014.

Ahead of the 2020 season, and in consultation with the San Francisco Giants and VCU Baseball, the Flying Squirrels are reducing outfield distances at the Diamond from 8 to 10 feet from left center field around to right center field. Exact distances are yet to be determined. Distances up the foul lines will remain the same.

Other events
The venue hosted the 1987 and 1988 Colonial Athletic Association baseball tournaments, won by East Carolina and George Mason, respectively.

The ballpark hosted the 1992 Triple-A All-Star Game. The team of American League-affiliated All-Stars defeated the team of National League-affiliated All-Stars, 2–1.

The Diamond also hosted the 2019 Eastern League All-Star Game before 9,560 fans, the largest crowd in the game's history.

The ballpark is also home to Virginia Commonwealth University's Rams baseball team. VCU hosts Atlantic 10 and regional teams at the Diamond.

The venue was to host the 2020 Atlantic 10 Conference baseball tournament, which was cancelled due to the COVID-19 pandemic.

See also
 List of NCAA Division I baseball venues

References

External links

 Richmond Flying Squirrels
 The Diamond info
 The Diamond Views – Ball Parks of the Minor Leagues

College baseball venues in the United States
Minor league baseball venues
Sports venues in Richmond, Virginia
Baseball venues in Virginia
VCU Rams baseball
1985 establishments in Virginia
Sports venues completed in 1985
Eastern League (1938–present) ballparks